When a Man Loves is a 1919 American silent drama film directed by Chester Bennett and starring Earle Williams, Tom Guise and Margaret Loomis.

Plot
A young Englishman visits Tokyo and falls in love with a Japanese woman who he marries, but obstacles are presented by a jealous Englishwoman who hoped to marry him and the disapproval of his aristocrat father when he returns to Britain.

Cast
 Earle Williams as John Howard Bannister
 Tom Guise as Lord Bannister
 Margaret Loomis as Yuri San
 Edward McWade as Takamura
 Margaret McWade as Yaki
 John Elliott as Sir Robert Eastbourne
 George Hale as Ando Masuki
 Jean Calhoun as Gladys Lees 
 William Buckley as Martin Bradley
 Lillian Langdon as Lady Balfour

References

Bibliography
 Soister, John T., Nicolella, Henry & Joyce, Steve. American Silent Horror, Science Fiction and Fantasy Feature Films, 1913-1929. McFarland, 2014.

External links
 

1919 films
1919 drama films
1910s English-language films
American silent feature films
Silent American drama films
American black-and-white films
Films directed by Chester Bennett
Vitagraph Studios films
Films set in Tokyo
Films set in England
1910s American films
Films with screenplays by Richard Schayer